Cathrine Paaske Sørensen (born 14 June 1978) is a Danish former football midfielder who played for the Denmark women's national football team. She was signed to play for the Los Angeles Sol of the American Women's Professional Soccer league, but the team folded in February 2010. She then joined the two-time W-League champion Pali Blues, based in Los Angeles, for the 2010 season.

A two time Danish Player of the Year, Paaske Sørensen retired from football in 2010 to become a nurse.

Honours
With Sydney FC:
 W-League Premiership: 2009
 W-League Championship: 2009

References

1978 births
Living people
Danish women's footballers
Danish expatriates in Australia
Sydney FC (A-League Women) players
Expatriate women's soccer players in Australia
Denmark women's international footballers
Expatriate footballers in Sweden
Pali Blues players
FIFA Century Club
Fortuna Hjørring players
USL W-League (1995–2015) players
Danish nurses
Brøndby IF (women) players
Women's association football midfielders
2007 FIFA Women's World Cup players
Damallsvenskan players
Linköpings FC players